Day I Forgot is the second studio album by Pete Yorn, released on April 15, 2003.  It contained the single "Come Back Home," and featured R.E.M. guitarist Peter Buck on a number of tracks. The album peaked at #18 on the Billboard Top 200 Albums.

Track listing
All songs written by Pete Yorn.
"Intro"
"Come Back Home"
"Crystal Village"
"Carlos" (Don't Let It Go to Your Head)
"Pass Me By"
"Committed"
"Long Way Down"
"When You See the Light"
"Turn of the Century"
"Burrito"
"Man in Uniform"
"All at Once" 
"[Untitled]" (4 seconds of silence)
"So Much Work"
"Drive Away" – (bonus track from the Japanese import)
"Seventeen" – (bonus track from the Japanese import)
"Suspicious Minds" – (bonus track from the Japanese import)

Personnel
Ken Andrews - bass guitar, e-bow, electric guitar, programming, synthesizer, background vocals
Peter Buck - mandolin
Tim Dow - drums
Josh Freese - drums
Jeff Garber - slide guitar
Joe Kennedy Jr. - electric guitar
Scott Litt - cowbell, glockenspiel
Chalotte Martin - piano
R. Walt Vincent - bass guitar, beat box, Fender Rhodes, electric guitar, harmonica, mellotron, melodica, organ, piano, Prophet 5, string machine, Wurlitzer, xylophone
Brad Wood - percussion, programming, putney, background vocals
Pete Yorn - bass guitar, drums, snare drum, acoustic guitar, electric guitar, baritone guitar, percussion, lead vocals, background vocals

References

2003 albums
Pete Yorn albums
Albums produced by Brad Wood
Columbia Records albums